{{Automatic taxobox
| taxon = Quasimitra
| image = Quasimitra sanguinolenta (MNHN-IM-2000-21888).jpeg
| image_caption = Shell of Quasimitra sanguinolenta 
| authority = Fedosov, Herrmann, Kantor & Bouchet, 2018
| synonyms_ref = 
| synonyms=
| type_species= Quasimitra sanguinolenta (Lamarck, 1811) 
| subdivision_ranks = Species
| subdivision = See text
| display_parents = 3
}}Quasimitra is a genus of sea snails, marine gastropod mollusks in the subfamily Mitrinae of the family Mitridae.

Species
Species within the genus Quasimitra include:

 Quasimitra albocarnea (Bozzetti, 2016)
 Quasimitra barbieri (Poppe & Tagaro, 2006) (unreplaced junior homonym)
 Quasimitra bovei  (Kiener, 1838)
 Quasimitra brettinghami (E. A. Smith, 1906)
 Quasimitra cardinalis (Gmelin, 1791)
 Quasimitra floccata (Reeve, 1844)
 Quasimitra fulgurita (Reeve, 1844)
 Quasimitra lacunosa (Reeve, 1844)
 Quasimitra lamarckii (Deshayes, 1832)
 Quasimitra latruncularia (Reeve, 1844) 
 Quasimitra leforti  (H. Turner, 2007)
 Quasimitra manuellae (T. Cossignani & V. Cossignani, 2006)
 Quasimitra marmorea (H. Turner, 2007)
 Quasimitra nubila (Gmelin, 1791)
 Quasimitra nympha (Reeve, 1845)
 Quasimitra propinqua  (A. Adams, 1853)
 Quasimitra pseudobovei (T. Cossignani & V. Cossignani, 2005)
 Quasimitra puncticulata (Lamarck, 1811)
 Quasimitra punctostriata (Lamarck, 1811)
 Quasimitra raphaeli (Drivas & Jay, 1990)
 Quasimitra rinaldii  (H. Turner, 1993)
 Quasimitra roselineae (J. C. Martin & R. Salisbury, 2013)
 Quasimitra rossiae (Reeve, 1844)
 Quasimitra rubrolaterculus R. Aiken & Seccombe, 2019
 Quasimitra sanguinolenta (Lamarck, 1811) 
 Quasimitra sarmientoi (Poppe, 2008)
 Quasimitra solida (Reeve, 1844)
 Quasimitra sophiae (Crosse, 1862)
 Quasimitra stossieri (Herrmann, 2016)
 Quasimitra structilis  (Herrmann & R. Salisbury, 2013)
 Quasimitra variabilis (Reeve, 1844)

Synonyms
 Quasimitra houarti Dharma, 2021: synonym of Quasimitra stossieri'' (Herrmann, 2016) (junior subjective synonym)

References

External links
  Fedosov A., Puillandre N., Herrmann M., Kantor Yu., Oliverio M., Dgebuadze P., Modica M.V. & Bouchet P. (2018). The collapse of Mitra: molecular systematics and morphology of the Mitridae (Gastropoda: Neogastropoda). Zoological Journal of the Linnean Society. 183(2): 253-337

 
Mitridae
Gastropod genera